I Sing the Body Electric is the second studio album released by the American jazz fusion band Weather Report in 1972.

Recording 
The album includes two new members of the band: percussionist Dom Um Romão and drummer Eric Gravatt.  The last three tracks were recorded live in concert in Tokyo, Japan on January 13, 1972.  These tracks have been edited for this album and can be heard in their entirety on Weather Report's 1972 import album Live in Tokyo.

Title 

The album takes its name from an 1855 poem by Walt Whitman and a 1969 short story by Ray Bradbury.

Critical reception 
Reviewing in Christgau's Record Guide: Rock Albums of the Seventies (1981), Robert Christgau wrote: "Significantly less Milesian than their debut, which is impressive but not necessarily good—the difference is that this is neater, more antiseptic, its bottom less dirty and its top less sexy. I find myself interested but never engaged, and I'm sure one piece is a flop—'Crystal', described by the annotator as 'about' time. Sing the body electric and I'm with you. Sing the body short-circuited and you'd better turn me on."

Track listing

Personnel 

Weather Report

 Josef Zawinul - electric & acoustic pianos, synthesizers (ARP 2600)
 Wayne Shorter - saxophones
 Miroslav Vitouš - bass
 Eric Gravatt - drums
 Dom Um Romão - percussions
Special Guests

On "Unknown Soldier":
 Andrew White - cor anglais
 Hubert Laws, Jr. - flute
 Wilmer Wise - D & piccolo trumpets
 Yolande Bavan - vocals
 Joshie Armstrong - vocals
 Chapman Roberts - vocals
 Roger Powell - ARP programming

On "The Moors":
 Ralph Towner - 12-string guitar

Technical
 Wayne Tarnowski, Susumu Satoh - engineers
 Robert Devere - executive producer
 Don Meehan - mixing
 Ed Lee - cover design
 Fred Swanson, Jack Trompetter - cover artwork

References

External links 

Weather Report Annotated Discography: I Sing the Body Electric

1972 albums
Columbia Records albums
Weather Report albums